In physics, motion is the phenomenon in which an object changes its position with respect to time. Motion is mathematically described in terms of displacement, distance, velocity, acceleration, speed and frame of reference to an observer and measuring the change in position of the body relative to that frame with change in time. The branch of physics describing the motion of objects without reference to its cause is called kinematics, while the branch studying forces and their effect on motion is called dynamics.

If an object is not changing relative to a given frame of reference, the object is said to be at rest, motionless, immobile, stationary, or to have a constant or time-invariant position with reference to its surroundings. Modern physics holds that, as there is no absolute frame of reference, Newton's concept of absolute motion cannot be determined. As such, everything in the universe can be considered to be in motion.

Motion applies to various physical systems: objects, bodies, matter particles, matter fields, radiation, radiation fields, radiation particles, curvature, and space-time. One can also speak on the motion of images, shapes, and boundaries. In general, the term motion signifies a continuous change in the positions or configuration of a physical system in space. For example, one can talk about the motion of a wave or the motion of a quantum particle, where the configuration consists of probabilities of the wave or particle occupying specific positions.

Equations of motion

Laws of motion 
In physics, the motion of  bodies is described through two related sets of laws of mechanics. Classical mechanics for super atomic (larger than an atom) objects (such as cars, projectiles, planets, cells, and humans) and quantum mechanics for atomic and sub-atomic objects (such as helium, protons, and electrons). Historically, Newton and Euler formulated three laws of classical mechanics:

Classical mechanics 

Classical mechanics is used for describing the motion of macroscopic objects moving at speeds significantly slower than the speed of light, from projectiles to parts of machinery, as well as astronomical objects, such as spacecraft, planets, stars, and galaxies. It produces very accurate results within these domains and is one of the oldest and largest scientific descriptions in science, engineering, and technology.

Classical mechanics is fundamentally based on Newton's laws of motion. These laws describe the relationship between the forces acting on a body and the motion of that body. They were first compiled by Sir Isaac Newton in his work Philosophiæ Naturalis Principia Mathematica, which was first published on July 5, 1687. Newton's three laws are:
 A body at rest will remain at rest, and a body in motion will remain in motion unless it is acted upon by an external force. (This is known as the law of inertia.)
 Force is equal to the change in momentum per change in time. For a constant mass, force equals mass times acceleration.
 For every action, there is an equal and opposite reaction. So, the body which exerts  will be pushed backward.)

Newton's three laws of motion were the first to accurately provide a mathematical model for understanding orbiting bodies in outer space. This explanation unified the motion of celestial bodies and the motion of objects on Earth.

Relativistic mechanics 
Modern kinematics developed with study of electromagnetism and refers all velocities  to their ratio to speed of light . Velocity is then interpreted as rapidity, the hyperbolic angle  for which the hyperbolic tangent function . Acceleration, the change of velocity over time, then changes rapidity according to Lorentz transformations. This part of mechanics is special relativity. Efforts to incorporate gravity into relativistic mechanics were made by W. K. Clifford and Albert Einstein. The development used differential geometry to describe a curved universe with gravity; the study is called general relativity.

Quantum mechanics 
Quantum mechanics is a set of principles describing physical reality at the atomic level of matter (molecules and atoms) and the subatomic particles (electrons, protons, neutrons, and even smaller elementary particles such as quarks). These descriptions include the simultaneous wave-like and particle-like behavior of both matter and radiation energy as described in the wave–particle duality.

In classical mechanics, accurate measurements and predictions of the state of objects can be calculated, such as location and velocity. In quantum mechanics, due to the Heisenberg uncertainty principle, the complete state of a subatomic particle, such as its location and velocity, cannot be simultaneously determined.

In addition to describing the motion of atomic level phenomena, quantum mechanics is useful in understanding some large-scale phenomena such as superfluidity, superconductivity, and biological systems, including the function of smell receptors and the structures of protein.

Orders of magnitude 
Humans, like all known things in the universe, are in constant motion; however, aside from obvious movements of the various external body parts and locomotion, humans are in motion in a variety of ways which are more difficult to perceive.  Many of these "imperceptible motions" are only perceivable with the help of special tools and careful observation. The larger scales of imperceptible motions are difficult for humans to perceive for two reasons: Newton's laws of motion (particularly the third) which prevents the feeling of motion on a mass to which the observer is connected, and the lack of an obvious frame of reference which would allow individuals to easily see that they are moving. The smaller scales of these motions are too small to be detected conventionally with human senses.

Universe 
Spacetime (the fabric of the universe) is expanding, meaning everything in the universe is stretching, like a rubber band. This motion is the most obscure as it is not physical motion, but rather a change in the very nature of the universe. The primary source of verification of this expansion was provided by Edwin Hubble who demonstrated that all galaxies and distant astronomical objects were moving away from Earth, known as Hubble's law, predicted by a universal expansion.

Galaxy 
The Milky Way Galaxy is moving through space and many astronomers believe the velocity of this motion to be approximately  relative to the observed locations of other nearby galaxies. Another reference frame is provided by the Cosmic microwave background.

Sun and Solar System 

The Milky Way is rotating around its dense Galactic Center, thus the Sun is moving in a circle within the galaxy's gravity. All planets and their moons move with the Sun. Thus, the Solar System is in motion.

Earth 
The Earth is rotating or spinning around its axis. The Earth is also orbiting around the Sun in an orbital revolution.

Continents 
However, the velocities of plates range widely.

Internal body 
The human heart is constantly contracting to move blood throughout the body. Through larger veins and arteries in the body, blood has been found to travel at approximately 0.33 m/s. The most familiar would be the occurrence of peristalsis which is where digested food is forced throughout the digestive tract. The human lymphatic system is also constantly causing movements of excess fluids, lipids, and immune system related products around the body. The lymph fluid has been found to move through a lymph capillary of the skin at approximately 0.0000097 m/s.

Cells 
The cells of the human body have many structures and organelles which move throughout them. Cytoplasmic streaming is a way in which cells move molecular substances throughout the cytoplasm, various motor proteins work as molecular motors within a cell and move along the surface of various cellular substrates such as microtubules, and motor proteins are typically powered by the hydrolysis of adenosine triphosphate (ATP), and convert chemical energy into mechanical work. Vesicles propelled by motor proteins have been found to have a velocity of approximately 0.00000152 m/s.

Particles 
According to the laws of thermodynamics, all particles of matter are in constant random motion as long as the temperature is above absolute zero. Thus the molecules and atoms which make up the human body are vibrating, colliding, and moving. This motion can be detected as temperature; higher temperatures, which represent greater kinetic energy in the particles, feel warm to humans who sense the thermal energy transferring from the object being touched to their nerves. Similarly, when lower temperature objects are touched, the senses perceive the transfer of heat away from the body as a feeling of cold.

Subatomic particles 
Within the standard atomic orbital model, electrons exist in a region around the nucleus of each atom.  This region is called the electron cloud.  According to Bohr's model of the atom, electrons have a high velocity, and the larger the nucleus they are orbiting the faster they would need to move.  If electrons were to move about the electron cloud in strict paths the same way planets orbit the sun, then electrons would be required to do so at speeds which would far exceed the speed of light.  However, there is no reason that one must confine oneself to this strict conceptualization (that electrons move in paths the same way macroscopic objects do), rather one can conceptualize electrons to be 'particles' that capriciously exist within the bounds of the electron cloud. Inside the atomic nucleus, the protons and neutrons are also probably moving around due to the electrical repulsion of the protons and the presence of angular momentum of both particles.

Light 

The speed of light in vacuum (or ) is also the speed of all massless particles and associated fields in a vacuum, and it is the upper limit on the speed at which energy, matter, information or causation can travel. The speed of light in vacuum is thus the upper limit for speed for all physical systems.

In addition, the speed of light is an invariant quantity: it has the same value, irrespective of the position or speed of the observer. This property makes the speed of light c a natural measurement unit for speed and a fundamental constant of nature.

In 2011, the speed of light was redefined alongside all seven SI base units using what it calls "the explicit-constant formulation", where each "unit is defined indirectly by specifying explicitly an exact value for a well-recognized fundamental constant", as was done for the speed of light. A new, but completely equivalent, wording of the metre's definition was proposed: "The metre, symbol m, is the unit of length; its magnitude is set by fixing the numerical value of the speed of light in vacuum to be equal to exactly  when it is expressed in the SI unit ."  This implicit change to the speed of light was one of the changes that was incorporated in the 2019 redefinition of the SI base units, also termed the New SI.

Superluminal motion 
Some motion appears to an observer to exceed the speed of light. Bursts of energy moving out along the relativistic jets emitted from these objects can have a proper motion that appears greater than the speed of light. All of these sources are thought to contain a black hole, responsible for the ejection of mass at high velocities. Light echoes can also produce apparent superluminal motion. This occurs owing to how motion is often calculated at long distances; oftentimes calculations fail to account for the fact that the speed of light is finite. When measuring the movement of distant objects across the sky, there is a large time delay between what has been observed and what has occurred, due to the large distance the light from the distant object has to travel to reach us. The error in the above naive calculation comes from the fact that when an object has a component of velocity directed towards the Earth, as the object moves closer to the Earth that time delay becomes smaller. This means that the apparent speed as calculated above is greater than the actual speed. Correspondingly, if the object is moving away from the Earth, the above calculation underestimates the actual speed.

Types of motion 
 Simple harmonic motion – motion in which the body oscillates in such a way that the restoring force acting on it is directly proportional to the body's displacement. Mathematically Force is directly proportional to the negative of displacement. Negative sign signifies the restoring nature of the force. (e.g., that of a pendulum).
 Linear motion – motion which follows a straight linear path, and whose displacement is exactly the same as its trajectory. [Also known as rectilinear motion]
 Reciprocal motion
 Brownian motion (i.e. the random movement of particles)
 Circular motion
 Rotatory motion – a motion about a fixed point. (e.g. Ferris wheel).
 Curvilinear motion – It is defined as the motion along a curved path that may be planar or in three dimensions.
 Rolling motion – (as of the wheel of a bicycle)
 Oscillatory – (swinging from side to side)
 Vibratory motion
 Combination (or simultaneous) motions – Combination of two or more above listed motions
 Projectile motion –  uniform horizontal motion + vertical accelerated motion

Fundamental motions 
 Linear motion
 Circular motion
 Oscillation
 Wave
 Relative motion
 Fundamental motions

See also

References

External links 

 Feynman's lecture on motion
 

 
Mechanics
Physical phenomena